Moheibacter sediminis is a Gram-negative and strictly aerobic bacterium from the genus of Moheibacter which has been isolated from sediments from the Mohe Basin in China.

References

Flavobacteria
Bacteria described in 2014